The Sagor catfish, also called the Sagor sea catfish, the Sunda sea-catfish, the marine catfish or the dusky catfish, (Hexanematichthys sagor) is a species of catfish in the family Ariidae. It was described by Francis Buchanan-Hamilton in 1822, originally under the genus Pimelodus. It inhabits estuaries and freshwater bodies in numerous areas of the Indo-Western Pacific ocean.

The diet of the Sagor catfish consists of finfish and benthic invertebrates. Its meat is sold fresh.

References

Ariidae
Fish described in 1822